Susan Pulsipher is an American politician serving in the Utah House of Representatives, representing District 50.

Early life and career
Pulsipher lives in South Jordan.  She has a B.S. in Education and an M.Ed. in Education Leadership with a Policy emphasis from Brigham Young University.
She served on the Board of Education of the Jordan School District from 2011 through 2017.

Political career
Pulsipher was elected to the Utah House in 2016, defeating Democrat Patty Rich. She was reelected in 2018, defeating Democratic opponent Megan Wiesen.

References

Living people
Women state legislators in Utah
Republican Party members of the Utah House of Representatives
Year of birth missing (living people)
21st-century American politicians
21st-century American women politicians